The 2012 Shanghai International Film Festival was the 15th such festival devoted to international cinema held in Shanghai, China.

International Jury
The members of the jury for the Golden Goblet Award were:

 Jean-Jacques Annaud (France; president of the jury)
 Rakhshan Banietemad (Iran)
 Terence Chang (USA)
 Heather Graham (USA)
 Li Bingbing (China)
 György Pálfi (Hungary)
 Zhang Yang (China)

Winners

 Best Feature Film: The Bear, by Khosrow Masoumi (Iran)
 Jury Grand Prix: For The Love of God, by Micheline Lanctôt (Canada)
 Best Director: Gao Qunshu, Detective Hunter Zhang (China)
 Best Actress: Ursula Pruneda, The Dream of Lu (Mexico)
 Best Actor: Vladas Bagdonas, The Conductor (Russia)
 Best Screenplay: Kenji Uchida, Key of Life (Japan)
 Best Cinematography: Shi Luan, Falling Flowers(China)
 Best Music: Avshalom Caspi, Chrysalis (Spain)

References

External links
Official website

Shanghai International Film Festival
Shanghai International Film Festival
Shanghai
Shanghai
21st century in Shanghai